Karen Gómez Espinoza (born 10 June 1993)  is a Mexican professional footballer who plays as a goalkeeper for Querétaro and Guadalajara (commonly known as Chivas) in the Liga MX Femenil, the first professional women's football (soccer) league in Mexico. She has represented Mexico on the under-17 and under-20 national teams.

Early life and education
Gómez attended Universidad Panamerica where she played on the soccer team and majored in industrial engineering.

Playing career

Guadalajara, 2017–18
Gómez started the inaugural season of the Liga MX Femenil as Guadalajara's starting goalkeeper, but suffered an injury to her arm in August and lost her starting spot. She returned to the squad in February 2018.

Cruz Azul, 2018–19
In December 2018, Gómez signed with Cruz Azul.

Honors

Club
Guadalajara
Liga MX Femenil: Apertura 2017

References

External links
 
 Karen Gómez at C.D. Guadalajara Femenil (archived) 
  

1993 births
Living people
Mexican women's footballers
Footballers from Jalisco
Liga MX Femenil players
C.D. Guadalajara (women) footballers
Cruz Azul (women) footballers
Women's association football goalkeepers
20th-century Mexican women
21st-century Mexican women
Mexican footballers